Basophilic stippling, also known as punctate basophilia, is the presence of numerous basophilic granules that are dispersed through the cytoplasm of erythrocytes in a peripheral blood smear. They can be demonstrated to be RNA. They are composed of aggregates of ribosomes; degenerating mitochondria and siderosomes may be included in the aggregates. In contrast to Pappenheimer bodies, they are negative with Perls' acid ferrocyanide stain for iron (i.e. no iron in basophilic stippling). Basophilic stippling is indicative of disturbed erythropoiesis. It can also be found in some normal individuals.

Associated conditions 
 Thalassemia (β-thalassemia Minor (i.e. Trait) & Major, and α-thalassemia, only when 3 gene loci defective: (--/-α)) 
 Severe megaloblastic anemia 
 Hemolytic anemia 
 Sickle-cell anemia 
 Pyrimidine 5' nucleotidase deficiency
 Alcoholism
 Myelodysplastic syndromes
 Sideroblastic anemia
 Congenital dyserythropoietic anemia
 Primary myelofibrosis
 Leukemia
 Erythroleukemia
 Hemorrhage, e.g. from gastrointestinal tract
 CPD-choline phosphotransferase deficiency
 Unstable hemoglobins 
 Altered hemoglobin biosynthesis
 Heavy metal poisoning
 Lead poisoning
 Zinc
 Arsenic
 Silver
 Mercury

References

Abnormal clinical and laboratory findings for RBCs